Reuver is a railway station located in Reuver, Netherlands. The station originally opened in 1862 and is located on the Maastricht–Venlo railway on the section between Venlo and Roermond. Train services are operated by Arriva.

Train services
The following local train services call at this station:
Stoptrein: Nijmegen–Venlo–Roermond

Bus services
66: Venlo–Tegelen–Belfeld–Reuver–Swalmen–Roermond

External links
NS website 
Dutch public transport travel planner 

Railway stations in Limburg (Netherlands)
Railway stations opened in 1862
Beesel
1862 establishments in the Netherlands
Railway stations in the Netherlands opened in the 19th century